Dean Cameron (born Dean Eikleberry; December 25, 1962) is an American television and film actor and musician. He is known for his role as Francis "Chainsaw" Gremp in the 1987 Mark Harmon comedy Summer School. He also played Dave Marshak in Ski School and Ski School 2. Cameron, along with comedian Victor Isaac, tour in a two-person show that Cameron wrote, called The Nigerian Spam Scam Scam.

Early life
Cameron was born in Morrison, Illinois, the son of Kay Elizabeth (Kytle) Huff and Burton Robert Eikleberry. He spent his childhood in Oklahoma and summers in Santa Barbara, California. He graduated from Norman High School in Norman, Oklahoma.

Career
Dean has starred in short-lived television series like Spencer (1984), Fast Times (1986, a spinoff of the 1982 film Fast Times at Ridgemont High), They Came from Outer Space (1990), and Mister Sterling (2003). He made guest appearances on many TV series, including The Facts of Life, ALF, My Sister Sam, Will & Grace, ER, Felicity, Psych and It's Always Sunny in Philadelphia.

He performs a two-person show, The Nigerian Spam Scam Scam, in which he and actor Victor Isaac read from Cameron's 11-month correspondence with a Nigerian 419 scammer. The show was performed at the Edinburgh Fringe Comedy Festival in 2004 and 2005, the Just For Laughs festival and the Upright Citizens Brigade theater in 2006 and ran in Los Angeles from September 2004 to December 2004. The first professional show was at The Amaz!ng Meeting, TAM2 for the James Randi Educational Foundation in 2004.

Cameron co-wrote the 2001 feature film Hollywood Palms, wrote and directed a short film, "Glutton Falls" and directed/choreographed "Bukowsical", a late night musical theater parody at the Sacred Fools Theater Company in Los Angeles, California. Cameron directed the videos "Fat Girl" and "Pussy Whipped" for heavy metal band Steel Panther as well as co-wrote the song "Girl From Oklahoma" on their 2009 debut album Feel the Steel and "Supersonic Sex Machine" on their 2011 follow-up album Balls Out. Cameron also co-wrote and directed a presentation pilot for Steel Panther.

In 2006, he originated the role of Carl in Love Tapes, a play based on videotapes sent by a fan to guitarist Steve Vai. Love Tapes was written by Steven Banks and Penn Jillette and directed by Cameron's wife, Jessie Marion.

Cameron was one of the camera operators during the filming of the 2005 film The Aristocrats. During the 2005 Edinburgh Fringe Festival, he and comedian Paul Provenza shot a live version of The Aristocrats. The intent was to release it on the Special Features of the DVD. Cameron explained to actor Samm Levine in an interview, "We ended up naked and had props like mayonnaise, mustard and ketchup... applejuice... puppets... ". Because they were shooting late at night in a Scottish pub, no one had releases with them, one of the actors refused to sign the form afterwards and the film was never released.

Cameron is mentioned in the comedy-drama TV show Psych when character Shawn Spencer (played by actor James Roday) states, "No one paints a scene like Dean Cameron". The Robot Chicken television series also mentions him on their Christmas special during the introduction. The Star Trek parody opening says "Christmas, the birthday of Jesus, also the birthday of actor Dean Cameron, who played Chainsaw in the movie Summer School, now we celebrate these equally important men with the Robot Chicken Christmas Special".

Since late 1999, has worked as voiceover talent for radio and television commercials and animated series like Regular Show and We Bare Bears.

Music
His first purchased album was the hip hop record Straight Outta Compton which he played "the hell out of". Cameron credits his ability to play the guitar to Tammy Moore, a girl from the ninth grade. She asked him if he could play an instrument and he lied and said "I play banjo," The next day, he told her that he also played the guitar. "I had to learn how to play the guitar pretty quickly". He spent the next six months learning to play "Stairway to Heaven" from a friend. In the 1980s, he switched to the bass guitar.

In 2003, Cameron played bass guitar for a LA, local band called The Thornbirds (formerly called The Ducks). Cameron co-wrote the songs "Girl from Oklahoma" and "Supersonic Sex Machine" for the band Steel Panther, two of the members later joined The Thornbirds. When that group released All The Same in 2004, both of the songs were on that album. Cameron is also in a karaoke band that parodies actor/musicians, Corey Haim, Corey Feldman and Corey Hart called Coreyoke. Cameron says on his website that "may be the most fun i’ve ever had in my long life." The story line behind Coreyoke is that they are musicians from the 1980s who are trying to revive their careers and play backup for Michael Jackson.

Personal life
Cameron is married to Jessie Marion, granddaughter of actress Elena Verdugo, and lives in Los Angeles. Their son, Duncan, was born in August 2009. Cameron rarely uses capital letters. Cameron grew up without religion, and was a teen before he realized that "there was a thing called atheism". He credits his father with teaching him and his siblings to think critically.

Listed as a hard-core Libertarian on Cameron's IMDB profile, he tells interviewer Samm Levine that he prefers the term "Freedom Fighter". Cameron is also the inventor of the Bill of Rights: Security Edition Cards which have the Bill of Rights stamped on metal the size of a normal playing card. The idea is that they can be carried comfortably in the pocket of a flyer, and when a metal detector beeps after detecting the metal, the carrier will have to hand the TSA federal inspectors the card and "give up his Bill of Rights... before boarding a plane." The website also sells Bill of Rights luggage tags and socks with the rights printed on them.

Filmography

References

External links
 
 Web pilot for former me
 dean cameron does a lot of stuff YouTube Channel
 Dean Cameron YouTube Channel
 Dean Cameron Spam Scam Scam Website

1962 births
Living people
Actors from Oklahoma
Actors from Illinois
American atheists
American libertarians
American male film actors
American male television actors
Male actors from Illinois
Male actors from Oklahoma
People from Morrison, Illinois
People from Norman, Oklahoma